The NASA Shaped Sonic Boom Demonstration, also known as the Shaped Sonic Boom Experiment, was a two-year program that used a Northrop F-5E with a modified fuselage to demonstrate that the aircraft's shock wave, and accompanying sonic boom, can be shaped, and thereby reduced. The program was a joint effort between NASA's Langley Research Center, Dryden Flight Research Center at Edwards Air Force Base, California and Northrop Grumman.

The program became, at that time (2003), the most extensive study on the sonic boom. After measuring the 1,300 recordings, some taken inside the shock wave by a chase plane, the SSBD demonstrated a reduction in boom by about one-third.  Several of the flights included NASA Dryden's F-15B research testbed aircraft following to measure the F-5E's shock wave signature close-up. During the flights, many shock wave patterns were measured by the F-15B at various distances and orientations from the F-5E.

An unmodified F-5E flew a few seconds behind the demonstration aircraft to provide a baseline sonic boom measurement to validate the reduced boom produced by the demonstrator.

In addition, sonic boom data were gathered on the ground by an array of 42 sensors and recording devices along  under the flight path of the F-5E. Dryden-developed boom amplitude and direction sensors recorded ground-level sonic boom signature data.

The demonstration was initially part of the Quiet Supersonic Platform program funded by Defense Advanced Research Projects Agency (DARPA). Subsequently, the vehicle systems division of NASA's Office of Aeronautics funded the project. Northrop-Grumman Corporation's Integrated Systems Sector in El Segundo, California, modified the U.S. Navy F-5E aircraft into the SSBD aircraft. The aircraft is on display at the Valiant Air Command Warbird Museum at Titusville, Florida.

See also
Supersonic aerodynamics
Whitcomb area rule
Sound barrier
Mach number
 Quiet Spike
 Low Boom Flight Demonstrator
 Gulfstream X-54

References

External links 
 
 
 NASA Dryden Shaped Sonic Boom Demonstration Photo Collection
 "Quieting the Boom: The Shaped Sonic Boom Demonstrator and the Quest for Quiet Supersonic Flight" by Lawrence R. Benson (NASA Aeronautics Book Series)

NASA programs
DARPA
NASA aircraft
Northrop Grumman aircraft